Maxime Mora (born 10 July 1984) is a French badminton player. In 2004, he reach the men's singles quarter final at the Bulgarian International tournament. At the 2005 French Open, he also finished in the quarter final round. In 2008, he won the men's singles title at the French University Badminton Championship, and at the same year, he represented University of Paris XII competed at the World University Championships in Braga, Portugal.

Achievements

BWF International Challenge/Series 
Men's singles

  BWF International Challenge tournament
  BWF International Series tournament

References

External links 
 

1984 births
Living people
People from Bruges, Gironde
Sportspeople from Gironde
French male badminton players